was a Japanese civil servant and naturalist.

Born to a doctor of Traditional Chinese Medicine in Iida, Shinano Province, Tanaka studied pharmacognosy in his youth with Keisuke Ito. In 1861 he moved to Edo and joined the Bansho Shirabesho (Office for the Investigation of Foreign Documents) the following year. In this job, he worked on the documentation of local produce. He was part of the Japanese delegation at the 1867 Exposition Universelle in Paris, where he exhibited a number of entomological specimens; this journey also gave him the opportunity to learn about Western museum curation.

After the Meiji Restoration, the Japanese Civil Service was reorganised. Within the Daigaku (later the Ministry of Education) Tanaka joined the Bureau of Local Products, and then moved to the Museums Bureau in 1871. A decade later, his services were sought by the Ministry of Agriculture and Commerce to oversee the menagerie attached to the National Museum of Natural History; Tanaka took advantage of the opportunity to create Ueno Zoo. Opened in 1882, it was Japan's first zoological park. The creation of the zoo resulted in Tanaka's promotion to Director-General of the Natural History Bureau, however he received little ministerial support for his botanical and zoological planning and resigned from the post the following year.

In 1878 he helped to set up a school of agriculture in Komaba (which later became the University of Tokyo's Faculty of Agriculture) and in subsequent years was responsible for the founding of several societies, including the Dainippon Nokai ("Greater Japan Agricultural Society"), the Dainippon Sanrinkai ("Greater Japan Forestry Society") and the Dainippon Suisankai ("Greater Japan Fisheries Society"). He also published several books on botany and agriculture.

In 1890 he was elevated to the House of Peers and in 1915 he was granted the title of danshaku (baron).

Tanaka died in 1916. The Saxifragaceae species Tanakaea radicans is named after him.

References 

Japanese civil servants
1838 births
1916 deaths
20th-century Japanese botanists
Japanese naturalists
Members of the House of Peers (Japan)
People from Iida, Nagano
19th-century Japanese botanists